is a Japanese politician of the Democratic Party of Japan, a former member of the House of Councillors in the Diet (national legislature). A native of Yoshino District, Nara, he graduated from Kyoto University and received a master's degree from it. After serving in the House of Representatives for four terms, he was elected to the House of Councillors for the first time in 2004.  In September 2011 he was appointed as Minister of Land, Infrastructure, Transport and Tourism in the cabinet of newly appointed prime minister Yoshihiko Noda. However, Maeda left the ministry the following year after a series of censure motions   were passed by the House of Councillors in April 2012, which required prime minister Noda to dismiss both Maeda and the Minister of Defence Naoki Tanaka in order to get support from the opposition parties to pass his plan to increase Japan's consumption tax rate. Maeda retired from the House of Councillors after his term expired in 2016.

Notes

References

External links 
 Official website in Japanese.

1937 births
Living people
Politicians from Nara Prefecture
Kyoto University alumni
Members of the House of Representatives (Japan)
Members of the House of Councillors (Japan)
Democratic Party of Japan politicians
Ministers of Land, Infrastructure, Transport and Tourism of Japan